Brad Jones (born c. 1969) is an American basketball coach, currently an assistant coach for the Memphis Grizzlies of the National Basketball Association (NBA).

Early life
After graduating, he went on to play basketball at Lambuth University, where he was a part of the championship teams.

Coaching career
In 1995, after serving as an assistant coach he became the head coach at Lambuth University until 2001. In 2001, he joined the Utah Jazz organization as a scout and in 2007 became the head coach of the Utah Flash. In July 2010, his contract was not renewed.

In September 2010, Jones was named head coach of the Austin Toros. He led the team to the 2012 D League championship.  After the season, Jones left the team.

In July 2013, Jones was promoted by the Utah Jazz to full assistant coach after returning to the team the prior season as the assistant coach/player development.

He then served as the general manager of the Iowa Wolves and professional scout of the Minnesota Timberwolves.

On August 22, 2018, the Memphis Grizzlies hired Jones as the Memphis Hustle's head coach for their development team's second season. The following season, he was moved the Grizzlies' staff as an assistant coach.

References

1960s births
Living people
American men's basketball coaches
American men's basketball players
Austin Toros coaches
Basketball coaches from Pennsylvania
Basketball players from Pittsburgh
College men's basketball head coaches in the United States
Lambuth Eagles men's basketball players
Memphis Hustle coaches
Memphis Grizzlies assistant coaches
Sportspeople from Pittsburgh
Utah Flash coaches
Utah Jazz assistant coaches
Utah Jazz scouts